This is a list of Armenian scientists.

List

A
 Alexander Abian (1923–1999) mathematician
 Evgeny Aramovich Abramyan (1930–2014) founder of several research directions in the Soviet and Russian nuclear technology
 Sarkis Acopian (1926–2007)  inventor, designed and manufactured the first solar radio
 Hovannes Adamian (1879–1932) engineer, inventor of color television
 Sergei Adian (1931–2020) mathematician, head of the department of mathematical logic at the Steklov Institute of Mathematics
 George Adomian (1922–1996)  mathematician, developed the Adomian decomposition method (ADM) for solving nonlinear differential equations, both ordinary and partial, which was considered a mathematical revolution
 Noubar Afeyan, (b. 1962)  biochemical engineer, co-founder of the biotechnology company Moderna
 Tateos Agekian (1913–2006) astrophysicist, one of the pioneers of stellar dynamics
 George Aghajanian (born 1932) medical researcher, pioneer in the area of neuropharmacology
 Hagop S. Akiskal (1944–2021) psychiatrist; pioneer in the study of outpatient mood disorders; today's leading conceptual thinker in the area of bipolar subtyping; rose to prominence with his integrative theory of depression
 Artem Alikhanian (1908–1978)  nuclear physicist, one of the founders and first director of the Yerevan Physics Institute (YerPhI)
 Sos Alikhanian (1906–1985) geneticist, one of the founders of molecular genetics in the USSR, founder of the State Research Institute of Genetics (GosNIIgenetika)
 Abram Alikhanov (1904–1970)  nuclear physicist, one of the founders of nuclear physics in the USSR, founder of the Institute for Theoretical and Experimental Physics (ITEP)
 Roger Altounyan  (1922–1987) asthma researcher, pharmacologist who pioneered the use of cromolyn sodium inhalation therapy for asthma
 Sergey Ambartsumian (1922–2018) mechanician and engineer, the author of refined theories of elastic and magnetoelectroelastic plates, shells
 Viktor Ambartsumian (1908–1996) astrophysicist, one of the founders of theoretical astrophysics
 Apkar Apkarian pioneer in magnetic resonance spectroscopy research of the brain
 Emil Artin (1898–1962) mathematician, one of the founders of modern algebra
 Michael Artin (born 1934) mathematician, known for his contributions to algebraic geometry
 Andreas Artsruni (1847–1898) pioneer in geochemistry
 Gurgen Askaryan (1928–1997) physicist, inventor of light self focusing
 Lev Atamanov (1905–1981) animated films director, one of the founders of Soviet animation art
 Vandika Ervandovna Avetisyan (born 1928) botanist and mycologist, graduate of Yerevan State University; fellow of the Armenian National Academy of Sciences. Major contributor to knowledge of the flora of her native Armenia.
 Suren Ayvazyan (1933–2009)  geologist

B
 Boris Babayan (born 1933) computer scientist, father of Soviet and Russian supercomputing, founder of Moscow Center of SPARC Technologies (MCST)
 Viken Babikiancardiovascular researcher
 James P. Bagian (born 1952) NASA astronaut
 Oscar H. Banker (1895–1979) inventor of automatic transmission for automobiles
 Arthur H. Bulbulian (1900–1996) pioneer in the field of facial prosthetics

C
 Levon Chailakhyan (1928–2009) physiologist and cloning pioneer; produced  world's first successfully cloned mammal, mouse "Masha", 10 years before the famous "Dolly"
 Mikhail Chailakhyan (1902–1991) founder of hormonal theory of plant development
 Karapet Chobanyan (1927–1978) mechanical engineer, discovered the phenomenon of Low-Stress in mechanics. Made the first discovery in Armenia and Transcaucasus which was registered in the Soviet Union's discovery registry under the number 102
 Giacomo Luigi Ciamician (1857–1922)photochemist, "father of photochemistry and solar energy"

D
 Harry Daghlian (1921–1945) physicist who worked and died at the Manhattan Project Los Alamos laboratory
 Raymond Damadian (born 1936) physician, inventor of magnetic resonance imaging (MRI); produced the first MRI scan of the human body
 Mkhitar Djrbashian (1918–1994) mathematician, author of significant contributions to analysis
 Richard Donchian (1905–1993)  known as the father of trend following; a pioneer in the field of managed futures; considered to be the creator of the managed futures industry and is credited with developing a systematic approach to futures money management; developed the trend timing method of futures investing and introduced the mutual fund concept to the field of money management

E
 Nikolay Enikolopov (1924–1993)chemist, one of the founders of Russian polymer science

G
 Gregory M. Garibian (1924–1991) physicist, known for developing the Theory of Transition Radiation and showing the feasibility of functional transition radiation detectors (TRDs)
 Grigor Gurzadyan (1922–2014) outstanding astronomer; pioneer of space astronomy; pioneered the construction and use of small space telescopes, 20 years before the Hubble telescope

H
 Spiru Haret (1851–1912) astronomer, mathematician and politician
 Mkhitar Heratsi (12th century) medieval priest and physician; wrote an encyclopedia on medicine; theorized that fever results from internal changes in the body, a revolutionary idea for medieval medicine; his work included psychotherapy, surgery, diet and herbs to cure diseases
 Paris Herouni (1933–2008)radio physicist, astronomer; built world's most sophisticated radio telescope; has published over 340 scientific works

I
Bagrat Ioannisiani (1911–1985) engineer, designer of the BTA-6, one of the largest telescopes in the world
 Andronik Iosifyan (1905–1993) aerospace engineer, chief electrician of Soviet missiles and spacecraft, including the R-7 Semyorka and the Soyuz spacecraft
 Garik Israelian (born 1963) astrophysicist; in 1999 provided the first evidence that stellar mass black holes are produced from supernova explosions; founder of Starmus Festivals; awarded gold medal by the Government of Canary Islands

K
 Albert Kapikian (1930–2014) virologist, developed the first licensed vaccine against rotavirus
 Varaztad Kazanjian (1879–1974) pioneer and one of the founders of modern plastic surgery
 Alexander Kemurdzhian (1921–2003) aerospace engineer, designer of the first space exploration rovers for moon and mars
 Edward Keonjian (1909–1999) engineer, an early leader in the field of low-power electronics, the father of microelectronics, designed the world's first solar-powered, pocket-sized radio transmitter
 John W. Kebabian (1946–2012) neuroscientist, discovered the existence of multiple dopamine receptor subtypes
 Leonid Khachiyan (1952–2005) mathematician and computer scientist, best known for his ellipsoid algorithm for linear programming
 Edward Khantzianearly pioneer in the psychological understanding of addictions; co-originator of the self-medication hypothesis
 Tigran Khudaverdyan (born 1981)computer scientist, deputy CEO of Yandex
 Semyon Kirlian (1898–1978) pioneer of photography, discovered and developed Kirlian photography
 Ivan Knunyants (1906–1990) chemist, significantly contributed to the advancement of Soviet chemistry, one of major developers of Soviet chemical weapons program
 Samvel Kocharyants (1909–1993), nuclear scientist, developer of the first Soviet nuclear warheads for ballistic missiles

L
 Caro Lucas (1949–2010) computer engineer, leader in computer science in Iran
 Ignacy Łukasiewicz (1822–1882) pharmacist, one of the world's pioneers of the oil industry, built the world's first modern oil refinery

M
 Soukias Manasserianengineer and inventor
 Karen Manvelyanbiologist and environmentalist, director of the World Wildlife Fund in Armenia
 Benjamin Markarian (1913–1985) astrophysicist, known for Markarian's Chain
 Sergey Mergelyan (1928–2008)  mathematician, author of major contributions in approximation theory, founder and head of the department of complex analysis at the Steklov Institute of Mathematics
 Artem Mikoyan (1905–1970) aerospace engineer, designer of MiG jet aircraft; his fighters established 55 world records
 Dmitry Mirimanoff (1861–1945)  mathematician, contributed to set theory
 Hayk Mirzayans (1920–1999) entomologist; founder of the Hayk Mirzayans Insect Museum

N
 John Najarian (1927–2020) surgeon, pioneer in organ transplantation
 Aram Nalbandyan (1908–1987) physicist, prominent in the field of physical chemistry, founder of the Institute of Chemical Physics in Yerevan, Armenia
 Robert Nalbandyan (1937–2002) chemist; co-discoverer of photosynthetic protein plantacyanin; pioneer in the field of free radicals; leader in sickle cell research and testing methods

O
 Yuri Oganessian (born 1933) nuclear physicist in the Joint Institute for Nuclear Research (JINR), co-discoverer of the heaviest elements in the periodic table; element Oganesson
 Yuri Osipyan (1931–2008) physicist, known for his contributions to solid-state physics

P
 Charlie Papazian (born 1949) nuclear engineer
 Ardem Patapoutian, molecular biologist and neuroscientist, won the Nobel Prize in Medicine in 2021
 Mikhail Pogosyan (born 1956) aerospace engineer, general director of Sukhoi and United Aircraft Corporation (UAC)

S
 Dork Sahagianclimate scientist, contributed to three of four assessment reports by the Intergovernmental Panel on Climate Change (IPCC) (the work of the IPCC, including the contributions of many scientists, was recognised by the joint award of the 2007 Nobel Peace Prize)
Vladimir Sargsyan (1935–2013) mathematician, mechanician, founder of physical and geometrical small parameter method
 Hrayr ShahinianDirector of the Skull Base Institute
 Gagik Shmavonyan (born 1963) nanotechnology researcher and professor at the National Polytechnic University of Armenia
 Luther George Simjian (1905–1997) inventor of 200 inventions, including the autofocus camera, ATMs, flight simulator, postage meter, teleprompter, medical ultrasound, golf simulator, meat tenderizer, and color X-ray machine
 Norair Sisakian (1907–1966) biochemist, one of the founders of space biology

T
 Armen Takhtajian (1910–2009) botanist, one of the most influential taxonomists of the latter twentieth century
 Guy Terjanianmathematician, has worked on algebraic number theory
 Karen Ter-Martirosian (1922–2005) theoretical physicist, known for his contributions to quantum mechanics and quantum field theory, founder and head of the department of Elementary Particle Physics of the MIPT
 Michel Ter-Pogossian (1925–1996) medical physicist, father of positron emission tomography (PET)
 Avie Tevanian (born 1961) computer scientist, main developer of Apple Mac OS X

References 

Scientists And Philosophers
 
 
Lists of European scientists